Sir William Brandford Griffith, CBE (9 February 18588 January 1939) was a British legal writer and colonial judge who was the Chief Justice of the Gold Coast from 1895 to 1911.

The eldest son of William Brandford Griffith, Governor of the Gold Coast from 1885 to 1895, he was educated at University College London, graduating B.A. in 1880, and was called to the bar by the Middle Temple in 1881. In 1884 he married Eveline Florence Elizabeth Nevins, daughter of Penrose Nevins. He was a magistrate in Jamaica before his appointment as Chief Justice of the Gold Coast.

He was knighted in 1898.

Publication 
 Kenneth James Beatty: Human leopards. An account of the trials of human leopards before the Special Commission Court. With a note on Sierra Leone, past and present. With a preface by Sir William Brandford Griffith. London, H. Rees, 1915. [Repr. 1978 New York, AMS Press: ]

References

External links
 Portrait of Sir William Brandford Griffith at National Portrait Gallery, London.

1858 births
1939 deaths
Gold Coast (British colony) judges
Chief justices of Ghana
Attorneys General of the Colony of Jamaica
Colony of Jamaica judges
Colonial Nigeria judges
Alumni of University College London
Knights Bachelor
Commanders of the Order of the British Empire
Members of the Middle Temple